Shawn Ku is a U.S. choreographer and motion picture director. He has also danced on Broadway, and acted in an independent feature-length film. Inspired by his family's personal connection to the Virginia Tech shooting and unexpected death of a visiting friend, Shawn Ku developed his 2010 film Beautiful Boy from those experiences.

Personal life 
Ku went to Harvard University as a chemistry pre-medical major and was accepted to Columbia medical school, before beginning his entertainment career.

Credits 
Samsara (2001) - actor
Making Tracks (2002) - choreographer
Pretty Dead Girl (2004) - writer, director
The American Mall (2008) - choreographer, director
Beautiful Boy (2010) - writer, director
A Score to Settle (2019) - director

References

External links 

American film directors
American choreographers
Living people
American people of Chinese descent
Harvard University alumni
Year of birth missing (living people)